Cârjiți is a commune in Hunedoara County, Transylvania, Romania. It is composed of five villages: Almașu Sec (Szárazalmás), Cârjiți, Chergheș (Kerges), Cozia (Kozolya) and Popești (Popesd).

References

Communes in Hunedoara County
Localities in Transylvania